The People's Representative Council of the Republic of Indonesia for the period 1971-1977 (abbreviated as DPR-RI 1971-1977) was the People's Representative Council of the Republic of Indonesia filled by members resulting from the legislative elections held in 1971. Members of the People's Representative Council were sworn in on 28 October 1971, consisting of 460 members, representing 10 different parties. This was until the merging of the parties in 1973, resulting on only 3 parties being represented.

Leadership

Speaker

Deputy speaker

Members

Notes

References 

People's Representative Council
Elections in Indonesia